Giovanni Tommaso Rovetta, O.P. (8 September 1632 – 14 April 1719) was a Roman Catholic prelate who served as Bishop of Hvar (1693–1704).

Biography
Giovanni Tommaso Rovetta was born in Brixien on 8 September 1632 and ordained a priest in the Order of Preachers on 18 December 1655.
On 8 June 1693, he was appointed during the papacy of Pope Innocent XII as Bishop of Hvar.
On 14 June 1693, he was consecrated bishop by Marcantonio Barbarigo, Bishop of Corneto e Montefiascone, with Ercole Domenico Monanni, Bishop of Terracina, Priverno e Sezze, and Giovanni Battista Visconti Aicardi, Bishop of Novara, serving as co-consecrators.
He served as Bishop of Hvar until his resignation on 1 April 1704. 
He died on 14 April 1719.

While bishop, he was the principal co-consecrator of Francesco Martinengo, Auxiliary Bishop of Brescia (1711).

References

External links and additional sources
 (for Chronology of Bishops) 
 (for Chronology of Bishops) 

17th-century Roman Catholic bishops in Croatia
18th-century Roman Catholic bishops in Croatia
Bishops appointed by Pope Innocent XII
1632 births
1719 deaths
Dominican bishops
Italian expatriate bishops
18th-century Roman Catholic bishops in the Holy Roman Empire
17th-century Roman Catholic bishops in the Holy Roman Empire